"Da Vinci" is a song by the American rock band Weezer. It was released as the third single from the band's ninth studio album Everything Will Be Alright in the End on November 18, 2014.

Critical reception
Scott Heisel of Alternative Press stated ""Da Vinci" is another example of Cuomo & Co. being absolute masters at their game." Lyrically, Heisel praises it as a love song, saying "The words are clear without being direct, making the lyrics potentially universal." By contrast, Michael Nelson of Stereogum considers the lyrics "cringe-worthy". Nelson, however, praises the chorus and bridge. Matthew McGuire at Crescent Vale considers it "one of the top tracks of the album with pop structured guitar riffs."

Chart performance

References

2014 singles
2014 songs
Republic Records singles
Song recordings produced by Ric Ocasek
Songs written by Rivers Cuomo
Weezer songs
Songs written by Josh Alexander